The Deschênes River is a tributary of the south shore of the Petit Saguenay River flowing into the unorganized territory of Sagard in the Charlevoix-Est Regional County Municipality, Quebec, Canada.

The valley of the Deschênes River is mainly served by route 170 along its entire route.

Forestry is the first economic activity in the sector; recreational tourism activities, second.

The surface of the Deschênes River is usually frozen from the beginning of December to the end of March, however, safe ice circulation is generally from mid-December to mid-March.

Geography 
The main hydrographic slopes adjacent to the Deschênes River are:
 North side: Petit Saguenay River, Saguenay River;
 East side: rivière de la Baie des Rochers, Noire River;
 South side: Noire River;
 West side: Petit Saguenay River.

The Deschênes River rises at the mouth of a Deschênes Lake. This appendix receives the waters of Lakes Clapin, Dédé and Gauthier. The resort is mainly developed on the southwestern shore, along route 170. Its mouth is located at the bottom of a bay on the north shore. The mouth of Lake Deschênes is located at:
  south-east of its mouth (confluence with the Petit Saguenay River);
  south-east of the Saguenay River (confluence of the Petit Saguenay River);
  south-east of the village center of Petit-Saguenay;
  south-east of the village center of L'Anse-Saint-Jean.

From its source (Deschênes Lake), the course of the Deschênes River descends on  according to the following segments:
 northwesterly to Lawrence Creek (coming from the west);
 northerly meandering through a valley flared into the mountains to a bend in the Petit Saguenay River

The mouth of the Deschênes River flows into a river bend on the south shore of the Petit Saguenay River. This confluence is located at:

  south of the village center of Sagard;
  south-east of the village center of L'Anse-Saint-Jean;
  south-east of the center of the village of Petit-Saguenay;
  south-east of the confluence of the Petit Saguenay River with the Saguenay River;
  south-east of the mouth of the Saguenay River.

Toponymy
The term "Deschênes" is a surname of French origin. This toponym is widespread in French America.

The toponym "Rivière Deschênes" was officialized on December 5, 1968, at the Bank of Place Names of the Commission de toponymie du Québec.

References

External links

See also 
 Petit-Saguenay, a municipality
 Saguenay River, a watercourse
 Petit Saguenay River, a watercourse
 List of rivers of Quebec

Rivers of Capitale-Nationale
Charlevoix-Est Regional County Municipality